KAUO-LD, virtual channel 15 (UHF digital channel 14), is a low-powered Country Network-affiliated television station licensed to Amarillo, Texas, United States. Owned by HC2 Holdings, it is a sister station to Estrella TV affiliates KLKW-LD (channel 22) and KNKC-LD (channel 29).

History
The station's construction permit under the callsign K14NO-D was originally owned by EICB TV, LLC. The construction permit was granted by the FCC on February 25, 2010.

The station sale to DTV America Corporation was instituted in early 2016. DTV America signed on KAUO-LD upon the station's callsign change in June 2016. It became a Bounce TV affiliate. The Doctor Television Channel (DrTV) returned to the Amarillo area through KAUO-LD2, and the Katz Broadcasting-operated comedy network Laff became available on the third subchannel (the network can also be seen on NBC affiliate KAMR-TV's third digital subchannel). DrTV was previously available via KLKW-LD2 until December 2015. In March 2018, the station added Quest programming to its seventh digital subchannel. In June 2018, the station's fourth digital subchannel replaced Cozi TV with Justice Network.

Digital channels
The station's digital signal is multiplexed, as of July 16, 2021, as follows:

References

External links

DTV America

True Crime Network affiliates
Low-power television stations in the United States
Innovate Corp.
AUO-LD
2016 establishments in Texas
Television channels and stations established in 2016